Mark Mouland (born 23 April 1961) is a Welsh professional golfer.

Mouland was born in St. Athan in the Vale of Glamorgan, and is the son of six times Welsh champion Sid Mouland. In 1976, he became the youngest ever winner of the British Boys Championship. He turned professional in 1981.

By 1986, Mouland was well established on the European Tour, winning that year's Car Care Plan International and finishing 30th on the Order of Merit. He broke his right ankle and left foot in a car crash later that year, but recovered to record the only two top-20 Order of Merit finishes of his career in 1987 (16th) and 1988 (18th). The 1988 KLM Dutch Open was his second and last win on the European Tour. He maintained steady form for many years, last finishing in the top hundred on the Order of Merit in 2001.

Mouland continued to compete into his mid forties, but mainly on the second tier Challenge Tour. He also won the Mauritius Open in 2002 and 2003.

Mouland began playing on the European Senior Tour after turning 50 in April 2011. He won his first title at the Belas Clube de Campo Senior Open de Portugal in October 2011. He will play on the Champions Tour in 2013 after finishing 3rd at Qualifying school in November 2012.

Amateur wins
1976 Boys Amateur Championship

Professional wins (8)

European Tour wins (2)

European Tour playoff record (0–2)

Other wins (5)
2002 Mauritius Open
2003 Mauritius Open
2008 Farmfoods British Par 3 Championship
2014 World par 3 Champion, Bermuda
2016 Farmfoods British Par 3 Championship

European Senior Tour wins (1)

Playoff record
Challenge Tour playoff record (0–1)

Results in major championships

Note: Mouland only played in The Open Championship.

CUT = missed the half-way cut
"T" = tied

Team appearances 
Amateur
Jacques Léglise Trophy (representing Great Britain & Ireland): 1977, 1978
European Amateur Team Championship (representing Wales): 1979

Professional
Alfred Dunhill Cup (representing Wales): 1986, 1988, 1989, 1990, 1993, 1995, 1996
Kirin Cup (representing Europe): 1988
World Cup (representing Wales): 1988, 1989, 1990, 1992, 1993, 1995, 1996, 2001

References

External links

Welsh male golfers
European Tour golfers
European Senior Tour golfers
PGA Tour Champions golfers
Sportspeople from the Vale of Glamorgan
People from Kenilworth
1961 births
Living people